Mike O'Donaghue (born in 1945) is a former Irish amateur road racing cyclist. O'Donaghue lived in Carlow and riding for the Carlow Team, he was one of the top amateurs in Ireland during the 1970s. His greatest win was the 1973 Rás Tailteann.

Links
http://www.rastailteann.com/event/fbdras_472.shtml

https://archive.today/20130708062027/http://www.cyclingireland.ie/Home/News/Cycling-Exhibition---Carlow-Co-Museum.aspx

References

Irish male cyclists
1945 births
Living people
Rás Tailteann winners